Droux is a commune in the Haute-Vienne department in the Nouvelle-Aquitaine region in western France.

Geography
The river Semme forms most of the commune's southwestern border, flows southwest through the middle of the commune, then flows into the Gartempe, which forms the commune's southern border.

Inhabitants are known as Drouniers.

See also
Communes of the Haute-Vienne department

References

Communes of Haute-Vienne